Domléger-Longvillers is a commune in the Somme department in Hauts-de-France in northern France.

Geography
It is surrounded by the communes Agenville, Cramont and Conteville.

Population
Its inhabitants are called Domlégeois and Domlégeoises in French.

See also
Communes of the Somme department

References

Communes of Somme (department)